How Hollow Heart... is a 1997 album by Dead Voices on Air.

The title of the album is taken from a poem by Samuel Beckett: "How hollow heart and full of filth thou art".

Track listing

Credits
Mark Spybey - performer, artwork, producer
Gerald Belanger - performer, engineer
Sheldon Drake - performer
Christopher Drost - performer
Heiki Sillaste - performer
Desmond K. Hill - lyrics and voice (on track 1)
Chris Greene - mastering

References

1997 albums